Underlined Passages is an American rock band from Baltimore, Maryland.

History
Underlined Passages was started as a duo studio project in 2014 by Frank Corl and Michael Nestor-former drummer, lead singer and guitarist of the band The Seldon Plan, when The Seldon Plan disbanded in 2013. . Shortly after Corl left the band in 2015, Nestor formed a live version of the band with bassist Rich Marcinek and percussionist Chris Shelley. In 2015, drummer Jamaal Turner joined the group and has appeared on all subsequent releases. Also In 2015, Underlined Passages joined Mint 400 Records and between 2015 and 2017 released three records with the label while touring as a live act.

Releases
Underlined passages released their first self-titled record in April, 2015. In April, 2016, they released their second full-length album, The Fantastic Quest. The single "Calamine" was subsequently released in May, 2016.  During tour support for their recent records, Underlined Passages performed at the 2016 and 2017 North Jersey Indie Rock Festival.

In September 2017, Underlined Passages released their third album Tandi My Dicafi.   The single "Silverlake" is a reference to Silver Lake, Los Angeles, California, an area that inspired Nestor and Turner during the writing and production. Nestor and Turner cite the music of Flying Nun Records as inspiration for the record. In early 2018, Tandi My Dicafi was released in limited edition vinyl, with bonus tracks "We Lost The Sea (Coda)" and "Interregnum," in conjunction with a tour of the East Coast of the United States.

Members
Roy Colquitt – bass (2017–present)
Michael Nestor – vocals and guitar (2014–present)
Jamaal Turner – drums (2015–present)

Former members
Frank Corl – drums (2014–2015)
Rich Marcinek – bass (2015–2016)
Chris Shelley – drums (2015)

Discography

Albums
Underlined Passages (2015)
The Fantastic Quest (2016)
Tandi My Dicafi (2017)
Neon Inoculation (2022)

Singles
"Everyone Was There" (2016)
"Calamine" (2016)
"Silverlake" (2017)

Appearing on
In a Mellow Tone (2015)

References

Bibliography

External links

Indie pop groups from Maryland
Indie rock musical groups from Maryland
Musical groups from Baltimore